List of articles related to roads and highways around the world.

International/World
 Asian Highway Network
 Arab Mashreq International Road Network
 Alaska Highway
 International E-road network
 Pan-American Highway
 Trans-African Highway network
 Interoceanic Highway

Argentina 

List of highways in Argentina

Australia 

Highways in Australia
Freeways in Australia

For state listings see:

Highways in New South Wales
List of highways in Victoria
List of highways in South Australia
List of highways in Western Australia
List of highways in Queensland
List of highways in the Northern Territory
List of highways in Tasmania

Bangladesh

 List of roads in Bangladesh

Belgium 

List of motorways in Belgium

Bolivia 
 Yungas Road

Botswana

Brazil

List of highways in Brazil
Rodovia Presidente Dutra
Interoceanic Highway (under construction)

Cambodia 
 Ancient Khmer Highway

Canada 

 Trans-Canada Highway

Chile 
List of highways in Chile

China
National Trunk Highway System
Ring roads of Beijing
Expressways of Beijing
China National Highways
Expressways of China
List of roads and streets in Hong Kong
Daxue Road
Central Beijing Road

Czech Republic
Highways in the Czech Republic

Cyprus
Motorways and roads in Cyprus

Finland 
Highways in Finland

France

Route nationale

Germany

German autobahns
List of federal highways in Germany

Greece 
Highways in Greece

Iceland
List of roads in Iceland

India
Roads in India
National Highways of India
List of National Highways in India
State highways in India
Transport in India

Indonesia
List of toll roads in Indonesia

Iran

Iraq 
List of Highways in Iraq

Ireland

List of streets and squares in Dublin

Israel

Italy

State highway (Italy)
Regional road (Italy)
Provincial road (Italy)

Japan

 Road transport in Japan

Korea, South
Expressways in South Korea

Kuwait 
 Transport in Kuwait

Malaysia 

 Malaysian Federal Roads System
 Malaysian State Roads system

Malta 
Transport in Malta
List of streets and piazzas in Valletta, Malta

Mexico

Madagascar

Morocco

The Netherlands

New Zealand

 New Zealand state highway network

Pakistan
Motorways of Pakistan
National Highways of Pakistan
List of expressways of Pakistan

Peru 
 Interoceanic Highway (under construction)

Philippines

Expressways of the Philippines
Highways of the Philippines

Poland

 Amber Road
 Voivodeship roads

Portugal 

Roads in Portugal

Romania

 Roads in Romania

Russia 

 Georgian Military Road
 Amur Cart Road (historical)

Singapore

South Africa

Numbered routes in South Africa
List of national routes in South Africa
List of provincial routes in South Africa
List of regional routes in South Africa
List of metropolitan routes in South Africa
Ring Roads in South Africa

Spain

Sri Lanka

Sweden

List of motorways in Sweden
Route 136 (Öland, Sweden)

Switzerland

cantonal roads
municipal roads
List of highest roads in Switzerland

Taiwan

 Highway System in Taiwan

Thailand
Thai highway network

Turkey

United Kingdom

 Prehistoric roads
 Sweet track
 Icknield Way
 Roman roads
 Ermine Street
 Fosse Way
 Watling Street

United States
Numbered Highways in the United States
List of Interstate Highways
List of U.S. Routes
Interstate Highway System
United States Numbered Highways
Historical roads and trails of the United States

Vietnam
Expressways of Vietnam

Notes

See also
Autobahn
Beltway, also called Ring road
Controlled-access highway
Rest area
Highway
Limited-access road
Toll road
Road
Grand Trunk Road
Roman road
Royal road
Silk Road
Historic roads and trails